Tallon Griekspoor and Botic van de Zandschulp defeated Rohan Bopanna and Matwé Middelkoop in the final, 3–6, 6–3, [10–5] to win the doubles tennis title at the 2022 European Open.

Nicolas Mahut and Fabrice Martin were the reigning champions, but Martin chose to compete in Naples instead. Mahut partnered Édouard Roger-Vasselin, but lost in the semifinals to Griekspoor and van de Zandschulp.

Seeds

Draw

Draw

References

External links
 Main draw

European Open - Doubles
2022 Doubles